Danny Alvarez is an American politician. He serves as a Republican member for the 69th district of the Florida House of Representatives.

Life and career 
Alvarez was born in Miami, Florida. He attended the University of Florida, Troy University, Stetson University College of Law and the University of Miami School of Law. He served in the United States Army.

In August 2022, Alvarez defeated Megan Petty in the Republican primary election for the 69th district of the Florida House of Representatives. In November 2022, he defeated incumbent Andrew Learned of District 59 in the general election, winning 57 percent of the votes. He succeeded Linda Chaney, who was redistricted to District 61.

References 

Living people
Politicians from Miami
Year of birth missing (living people)
Republican Party members of the Florida House of Representatives
21st-century American politicians
University of Florida alumni
Troy University alumni
Stetson University College of Law alumni
University of Miami School of Law alumni
Hispanic and Latino American state legislators in Florida
American politicians of Cuban descent